Ronald Eugene Hunter (born April 7, 1964) is an American college basketball coach and the current men's basketball head coach of the Tulane University Green Wave. His son, R. J. Hunter, was a first-round draft pick for the Boston Celtics.

High school
Hunter attended and played for Chaminade-Julienne High School in Dayton, Ohio from 1978 to 1982.

Coaching career

IUPUI
From 1994 to 2011, Hunter served as the head coach at IUPUI. Under his direction, the team advanced from an NAIA program to NCAA Division I. In its third season as a Division I program, Hunter led IUPUI to its first, and thus far only, NCAA tournament appearance in 2003.
On January 24, 2008, Hunter coached a game against Oakland University while barefoot. He did this to benefit Samaritan's Feet, a foundation that works to provide hope and love to impoverished children around the world by washing their feet and giving them a new pair of shoes. His goal was to collect 40,000 shoes, however, before tip-off, over 110,000 pairs of shoes had been donated.

Georgia State
On March 21, 2011, it was announced Hunter would replace Rod Barnes as the Georgia State Panthers' men's basketball head coach. During his first season at GSU, Georgia State won 22 games, the fourth most in school history.

Hunter captured national attention for a moment that occurred in the 2015 NCAA tournament. After tearing his Achilles celebrating the Panthers' Sun Belt Conference tournament championship, he was forced to coach their subsequent NCAA appearance while sitting on a rolling stool due to his injury. In their second-round game against the three-seed, Baylor, Hunter's son R.J. hit a deep, game-winning three with seconds left on the clock. When the shot went in, Hunter's stool slipped out from underneath him while exuberantly celebrating, sending him tumbling to the floor while continuing to display his jubilation. The moment spurred a torrent of media attention and resulted in multiple features, interviews, and a spot in 'One Shining Moment' at the conclusion of the tournament.

On November 20, 2017, in a win over Eastern Washington, Hunter earned his 400th career win.

Ron Hunter has played a key role in the ongoing transformation of the athletics culture at Georgia State, particularly with the basketball program and their continuing ascension from being one of the most unsuccessful programs in NCAA Division I history to being one of the premier Mid-Major programs in the nation. Some of Ron Hunter's most notable wins as head of coach of Georgia State are: VCU (2011), #16 Baylor (2015), Georgia (2018) and Alabama (2018). Hunter also notched a win against crosstown foe, Georgia Tech, in a 2017 charity exhibition known as the 'A-Town Showdown for Hurricane Relief'.

Tulane
On March 24, 2019, Hunter was named the head coach at Tulane, replacing Mike Dunleavy.

Head coaching record

*18 wins (including 8 conference wins) vacated by NCAA.

Personal life
Hunter and his wife, Amy, have two children: Jasmine and R. J. Hunter

References

External links
Georgia State bio
IUPUI bio

1964 births
Living people
20th-century African-American sportspeople
21st-century African-American people
African-American basketball coaches
American men's basketball coaches
American men's basketball players
Basketball coaches from Ohio
Basketball players from Dayton, Ohio
College men's basketball head coaches in the United States
Georgia State Panthers men's basketball coaches
IUPUI Jaguars men's basketball coaches
Miami RedHawks men's basketball coaches
Miami RedHawks men's basketball players
Milwaukee Panthers men's basketball coaches
Sportspeople from Dayton, Ohio
Tulane Green Wave men's basketball coaches